Aurelio Saco Vértiz Figari (born May 30, 1989) is a Peruvian footballer.

As he was born in Miami, Saco Vértiz also has American nationality.

Club career
Saco Vértiz began his senior career with Universidad San Martin in the 2008 season. His league debut in the Torneo Descentralizado came on February 20, 2008 in Round 2 at home to Sport Áncash. Manager Víctor Rivera put him in the match for goal-winning scorer Mario Leguizamón in the 79th minute to secure the 1–0 win for his side. The following game in Round 3 he played as a starter but only lasted until the 35th minute coming off for Ronald Quinteros in the thrilling 3–4 away win over Sporting Cristal.

In January 2016, Saco Vértiz signed with Fort Lauderdale Strikers of the North American Soccer League.

International career
While playing for Universidad San Martín, Saco Vértiz featured for the Peru U20 side in 2009.

Honours

Club
Universitario de Deportes 
 Torneo Descentralizado (1): 2013

Universidad San Martín
Peruvian League 
Winner (1): 2008

References 

1989 births
Living people
Soccer players from Miami
Association football fullbacks
Citizens of Peru through descent
Peruvian footballers
Peru youth international footballers
American soccer players
American sportspeople of Peruvian descent
Club Deportivo Universidad de San Martín de Porres players
Total Chalaco footballers
Club Universitario de Deportes footballers
Cienciano footballers
Fort Lauderdale Strikers players
Peruvian Primera División players
North American Soccer League players